Dconstructed (stylized in all caps) is a remix album released by Walt Disney Records on April 22, 2014.

Background
The album features remixes of select songs from various Disney films, animated shorts, television series, and theme park attractions by various contemporary electronic musicians.

The album includes Avicii's remix of Daft Punk's "Derezzed", which previously appeared in Tron: Legacy Reconfigured, though this version is rearranged and features new vocals. On the week of May 10, 2014, the remix album entered and peaked at position number 7 on the Billboard Dance/Electronic Albums chart.

Track listing

Charts

References

External links

2014 remix albums
Electro house remix albums
House music remix albums
Trance remix albums
Walt Disney Records remix albums